HDV is a format for recording of high-definition video on DV cassette tape.

HDV may also refer to:
 Hepatitis delta virus, the infectious agent that causes Hepatitis D
 Hepatitis D Virus, another name for the hepatitis delta virus
 Hypertrophic decidual vasculopathy
 Jacky Jasper, a Canadian-American rapper also known as HDV